The Croatian First League season of 1941 was the first held in the Independent State of Croatia. Exactly half the season was completed before the league finished play early. Građanski Zagreb was declared champion at this point.

League

External links
Croatia Domestic Football Full Tables

Croatian First league seasons
Croatia
Croatia
1